Ni-be-ni-me-ni-cucurigu is an 1878 play by Abraham Goldfaden. The somewhat nonsensical Yiddish title is variously translated as Not Me, Not You, Not Cock-a-Doodle-Doo or Neither This, Nor That, nor Kukerikoo; Lulla Rosenfeld says it had an alternate title The Struggle of Culture with Fanaticism. The title comes from a Russian expression "ни бе, ни ме, ни кукареку", meaning to understand nothing on the subject.

The play itself is lost. The plot centered on a cobbler who becomes a rabbi. Jacob Adler wrote of it that "this thin idea had been dressed out with so much stolen music that it was shameful to hear", but Lulla Rosenfeld, writing from a distance of over a century, argues that its combination of a "serious theme with an amusing nonsense plot" was emblematic of early Yiddish theater. "This emphasis on education, progress, enlightenment," she writes, "is found nowhere else in the popular comedy and melodrama of the nineteenth century. It is special to the Yiddish theater, which was, even from the beginning, a theater of ideas."

References
 Adler, Jacob, A Life on the Stage: A Memoir, translated and with commentary by Lulla Rosenfeld, Knopf, New York, 1999, 117.
 Bercovici, Israil, O sută de ani de teatru evreiesc în România ("One hundred years of Yiddish/Jewish theater in Romania"), 2nd Romanian-language edition, revised and augmented by Constantin Măciucă. Editura Integral (an imprint of Editurile Universala), Bucharest (1998). . Referenced only for the date of the play.
 Russian version or perhaps synopsis of the play: https://babel.hathitrust.org/cgi/pt?id=hvd.hx35u3&view=1up&seq=24&skin=2021

Yiddish plays
1878 plays